William Missouri Downs is an American comedy writer, playwright, screenwriter, stage director, and author.

Life and career 
William Missouri Downs started as an actor earning an MFA in acting from the University of Illinois, but a bout with viral encephalitis left him with a slight stammer and ended his acting career. So he moved to New York and studied playwriting at the Circle Rep Theatre under Lanford Wilson and Milan Stitt.

He then moved to Los Angeles and earned an MFA in screenwriting from UCLA. While a student at UCLA film school, he won numerous screenwriting awards, including the Jack Nicholson prize.

In Hollywood, he worked as a script secretary on NBC's Moonlighting and studied sitcom writing at the  Warner Brothers Sitcom Writing Workshop. He was a staff writer on NBC's My Two Dads, with writing credits on four episodes, under the pen name Bill Streib. As Streib, he also credited with writing one episode each for the NBC shows Amen and Fresh Prince Of Bel Air. In addition, he sold a movie to Ron Howard's Imagine Entertainment and optioned another to Filmways. He worked with Jim Parsons developing a TV pilot that was optioned by Hollywood producer Meryl Poster.

His plays include The Exit Interview (which premiered at the Orlando Shakespeare), winner of a rolling premiere from the National New Play Network, published by Samuel French; Women Playing Hamlet (which premiered at the Unicorn Theatre in Missouri), winner of a rolling premiere from NNPN, published by Playscripts;  Mad Gravity, a finalist at the Eugene O'Neill and winner of the Reva Shiner Comedy Award, premiering at the Bloomington Playwrights Project, published by Playscripts; Cockeyed winner of The Greenhouse Festival of New Plays, published by Samuel French; Seagulls in a Cherry Tree, winner of the Larry Corse Prize for Playwriting, published by Heuer Publishing; Mr. Perfect published by Playscripts; Headset, A View from the Light Booth published by Heuer Publishing; Kosher Lutherans published by Samuel French; Dead White Males published by Playscripts; How to Steal a Picasso, a finalist at the Eugene O'Neill; Innocent Thoughts, published by Next Stage Press; A Doll House (adaptation) published by Next Stage Press; Kabuki Medea, winner of the Bay Area Critics Award for Best Production in San Francisco; Kabuki Faust; and Forgiving John Lennon; and Fascism! The Musical.

There have been over 250 productions of his plays, including productions at the Orlando Shakespeare Theatre, the InterAct Theatre in Philadelphia, the San Diego Rep, the Berkeley Repertory Theatre, the Salt Lake City Acting Company, the Actors Theatre of Charlotte, the Jewish Theatre of Toronto, the Bloomington Playwright's Project, the Detroit Rep, and the New York City Fringe Festival.

His plays have been produced in Spain (Fuera de órbita), Canada, South Africa (Durban Performing Arts Center), Russia (Хороший парень - The Serov Theatre Drama After Chekhov, Serov), Singapore (The Hexis Theatre), Switzerland (Franklin University, Lugano,), Austria (stadt Theater walfischgasse, Vienna), Israel (The International Theatre Festival), India (Alliance Francaise de Bangalore, Bangalore), and South Korea (피카소를 훔치는 법 & 실제 게임 at Theatre in Daehangno & Daehakro Theatre,  Seoul).

Downs has an extensive publication record including articles,  plays, and books. He has co-authored four books, including Naked Playwriting (Silman/James), Playwriting: From Formula to Form (Harcourt Brace), Screenplay: Writing the Picture (Silman/James), and The Art of Theatre (Wadsworth/Cengage). The Art of Theatre has gone through multiple editions and has been adopted as a college textbook in the US.

Downs lives in a log cabin near the Shambhala Mountain Center in Colorado.

Awards
Downs has won two rolling premieres from the National New Play Network and twice been a finalist at the Eugene O'Neill. He also won the Beverly Hills Theatre Guild Julie Harris Award

Plays

Kosher Lutherans, published by Samuel French
Women Playing Hamlet, published by Playscripts
Mr. Perfect, published by Playscripts
Mad Gravity, published by Playscripts
Cockeyed, published by Samuel French
 Forgiving John Lennon
 Dead White Males, published by Playscripts
 The Exit Interview, published by Samuel French
 Headsets - A View from the Light Booth, published by Heuer Publishing
 Seagulls in a Cherry Tree, published by Heuer Publishing
 Innocent Thoughts, published by Next Stage Press
Fascism the Musical Life on my Knees How to Steal a Picasso Angry Psycho Princesses (the musical)You Can't Say That!How to Survive Your Family at ChristmasBooks

Monologues and Short Plays
Books on Tape, published by North West Theatre Review, Oregon State University (2008)Exceptional Monologues, published by Samuel French, New York (2009) The Best Women's Stage Monologues of 2016, published by Smith And Kraus (2011)222 Comedy Monologues, published by Playscripts (2016) Contemporary Scenes For Twentysomethings, Applause Books (2017)Contemporary Monologues For Twentysomethings, Applause Books (2018)Actor's Choice Monologue'', published by Playscripts, New York

References

External links 
 
 

Year of birth missing (living people)
Living people
American male dramatists and playwrights
American male non-fiction writers
American television writers
Screenwriters from Michigan
American information and reference writers
American instructional writers
American theatre directors
American male television writers
Screenwriting instructors
UCLA Film School alumni
Writers of books about writing fiction
20th-century American dramatists and playwrights
20th-century American non-fiction writers
20th-century American male writers
21st-century American dramatists and playwrights
21st-century American non-fiction writers
21st-century American male writers
American male screenwriters
People from Bay City, Michigan